A Summer's Tale is a 1996 French romantic comedy-drama film written and directed by Éric Rohmer. It is the third film in his Contes des quatre saisons (Tales of the Four Seasons) series, which also includes A Tale of Springtime (1990), Autumn Tale (1998), and A Tale of Winter (1992). A Summer's Tale stars Amanda Langlet, Melvil Poupaud, Aurélia Nolin and Gwenaëlle Simon.

The plot is loosely based on Rohmer's experiences as a younger film student and his various relationships.

The film was screened in the Un Certain Regard section at the 1996 Cannes Film Festival.

Plot
  
Gaspard, a mathematics graduate and musician, is on summer holiday by the seaside in Dinard. He arrives alone and spends all his time in his friend's empty flat composing music and walking around the town. He meets Margot, a cheerful waitress, at her aunt's restaurant. Despite his initial indifference, they soon become friends and take daily walks around the local beaches and parklands. Margot is an ethnologist, working with some of the locals in her spare time. Gaspard has an on again/off again girlfriend, Léna, who is planning to visit Dinard. Margot has just broken up with a boyfriend because their future careers are incompatible. Gaspard speaks of his confused relationship with Léna while Margot patiently offers advice. Gaspard, an incompetent romantic, doesn't know what to make of their growing closeness and clumsily tries to kiss Margot. She lightheartedly brushes the attempt off and they continue their easy friendship. Margot takes Gaspard on many outings, including a research trip to a local fisherman's house to discuss maritime folk songs. Gaspard is inspired by the fisherman's stories and writes his own sea shanty, a diversion from his typical blues music.

Gaspard joins Margot's friends for a night of dancing at a local bar where he feels out of place. One of the girls in the social circle, Solène, notices Gaspard and takes a liking to him. Solène is more sensual, confident, and straightforward in her approach with Gaspard. She conveniently runs into Gaspard at the beach and invites him to another beach across the bay where Solène's uncle has a house and a boat. Solène, a former choir singer, also shows interest in Gaspard's music when he plays the guitar for her while lounging in her uncle's living room. Her attraction to him and his musical talent boosts his low self-esteem with women. Solène, who just broke up with two suitors herself has very defined ideas of commitment and the romantic process and Gaspard falls into line as she becomes his best option at the moment. They decide to take a trip to Ouessant, an island off the tip of Brittany, the next week.

Gaspard's on again/off again girlfriend, the blonde and patrician-class Léna, finally arrives. She finds Gaspard at the beach and appears genuinely excited to see him after the long delay. Gaspard, who has been flummoxed by Léna's standoffish behavior in the past, is delighted at her renewed interest in him and begins to set the stage to renege on the vacation with Solène. During this time, Margot is in the background attempting to consult with him on his growing dilemma, but it is slowly appearing that she is also part of the Gaspard's romantic dilemma. Whenever he is with one of the girls, he gravitationally moves to the option closest to him at the time. His inability to commit to a choice leads Gaspard into the trap of double-booking the trip with both Léna and Solène.

Later in the week, Léna, who is prone to moody outbursts, professes that she is not in love with Gaspard and adds him into the general mix of men that she is sick and tired of. Gaspard, seeing Léna as the most difficult challenge, attempts to show affection but she runs away angry that she cannot find a true love companion. It would appear to Gaspard that his only real option is Solène, but on a walk with Margot, he again kisses her and this time it is reciprocated. Tired of Léna's moods and Solène's pressure, Gaspard then tells Margot he only wants to travel with her to Ouessant as he realizes their relationship is more honest and caring.

While Gaspard is writing music he is interrupted by several phone calls. The first is Léna, who apologizes for her poor behavior and re-invites herself back to Ouessant. Solène is also in the mix, essentially committing to the trip and then hanging up abruptly before any bad news can be relayed to her. Gaspard, who now has a dilemma since he has promised all three women he would take them to Ouessant, is saved by a phone call from a friend who has found a good deal on recording equipment. It's an offer too good to pass up and he decides to leave town and not confront his problems.

He asks Margot to meet him at the ferry before he departs where he explains the situation. There, she surprises him with the announcement that she is reuniting with her old boyfriend and leaving the seaside town. Gaspard is surprised at the news, assuming that Margot would always be there for him. As they walk down the ramp to the ferry they say their goodbyes and kiss. It is apparent that both have romantic feelings for each other but they decide their honest friendship is more important. Margot leaves the harbour as the camera watches Gaspard's boat leave for his future in Rennes.

Cast
 Amanda Langlet as Margot
 Melvil Poupaud as Gaspard
 Aurelia Nolin as Léna
 Gwenaëlle Simon as Solène
 Aimé Lefèvre as the Newfoundlander
 Alain Guellaff as Uncle Alain
 Evelyne Lahana as Aunt Maiwen
 Yves Guérin as accordionist
 Franck Cabot as cousin

Themes
Considered one of the more conventional films by Rohmer (due to its autobiographical nature) with minimal metaphors. The film's youthful characters obsess about their self-image and the overarching theme is how romantic relationships define self-image and projection of self worth. Gaspard sees Léna, regardless of her behavior, as a better business decision. Solène is trying to redefine her "townie" image with an upgrade to a moody, mysterious artist, Léna is profoundly dissatisfied with Gaspard being her best option in life. The most confident of the four characters, Margot, seems to be patiently waiting for Gaspard to find himself and discover her love.

The filming is mostly on the tourist beaches, except when Margot extracts Gaspard for excursions out of his comfort zone. The beach, water scenes being somewhat closed-minded provincial confinement. We do not see Gaspard's relationships with Solène nor Léna as expanding past the beaches and water sports. Margot and Gaspard's long walks and conversations lead them outside of the tourist areas and outside the town.

Rohmer's use of clothing appears to be a metaphor for the personality types Gaspard has to choose from. After the first scene at the beach, Gaspard does not see Margot in swimwear again. Her attire is loose, casual and she appears sloppily in pajamas in a later scene. Her skirts are often short and she appears to use her legs to flirt with the oblivious Gaspard. Léna and Solène's personalities seem to drift with the clothing choices. Léna is accepting, sexual and embracing in her bikini, but cold, uptight and angry in her street clothes. In a similar fashion, the provocative Solène is more hot-headed and quick to anger when she appears in street clothes.

Time plays an important role in the film: title-cards tell the viewer exactly what day it is from 17 July to 6 August. Gaspard tracks the days until Léna is meant to arrive, and then tracks how many days late she is, while walking with Margot and scanning the beaches for her. Characteristically of Rohmer's films, time is shown highly linearly. There are no flash-backs, and there is no extradiegetic music in the film, except for the final scene.

Other typically Rohmerian themes present here include the ideas of self-deception and coincidence, especially applied to a protagonist who does something unexpected while waiting for someone else, and then has to make a difficult choice. Gaspard came to Dinard to wait for Léna, but he develops a close friendship with Margot and has a romance with Solène. When Léna unexpectedly appears, Gaspard is caught in a trap of his own making. To Solène, Gaspard downplays his relationship with Léna. When Solène or Léna show him kindness, Gaspard effusively praises them to Margot. And when they fight, Gaspard becomes extremely pessimistic about their prospects. Margot speaks for the viewer when she says that she fails to understand Gaspard: is he passively trying to keep his romantic interests by pleasing them, or is he a cunning game-player with a plan? Is he deceiving these women, or is he deceiving himself? And who is the substitute for whom? These questions are left open to the viewer's interpretation.

Release
In 1996, due to various economic issues with independent movie theaters and home video, the film was not released in the United States along with many other foreign films. It finally received a limited release on 20 June 2014	.

References

External links
 
 
 

1996 films
1996 comedy-drama films
1996 romantic comedy films
1996 romantic drama films
1996 romantic comedy-drama films
Films about vacationing
Films directed by Éric Rohmer
Films produced by Margaret Ménégoz
French romantic comedy-drama films
1990s French films
1990s French-language films